Galaxy is an outdoor sculpture by Alexander Liberman, installed outside Oklahoma City's Leadership Square, in the U.S. state of Oklahoma.

Description
It is painted red and weighs 14 tons.

History
The sculpture was commissioned by art advisor Sharon Corgan Leeber of Architectural Arts Company, for her client Leadership Properties, Inc. It was constructed at the artist's studio in Connecticut and relocated to Oklahoma City in three pieces. Liberman visited Oklahoma City to present the maquette and for the unveiling.

The work was surveyed by the Smithsonian Institution's "Save Outdoor Sculpture!" program in 1994.

References

External links

 

Abstract sculptures in the United States
Outdoor sculptures in Oklahoma City
Steel sculptures in the United States